L'Étrat is a commune in the Loire department in central France.

Population

Twin towns
L'Étrat is twinned with:

  Vörstetten, Germany

See also
Communes of the Loire department

References

Communes of Loire (department)